France and Wales have played each other at rugby union since 1908. A total of 103 matches have been played, with Wales winning 51 times, France 49 times and the remaining three finishing as draws.

The early years of the fixture were dominated by Wales, who won 18 of the first 19 matches before France were expelled from the Five Nations Championship after the 1931 tournament. Since France rejoined the competition in 1947, they have won 46 of the 82 matches played, including a 12-match winning streak between 1983 and 1993. The teams have met twice in the Rugby World Cup, firstly in the semi-finals of the 2011 tournament, which France won 9–8, then in the quarter-finals of the 2019 Rugby World Cup, which Wales won 20–19.

Summary
Note: Summary below reflects test results by both teams.

Overview

Records
Note: Date shown in brackets indicates when the record was or last set.

Results

XV results
Below is a list of matches that France has awarded matches test match status by virtue of awarding caps, but Wales did not award caps.

References

Wales national rugby union team matches
France national rugby union team matches
Six Nations Championship
Rugby union rivalries in France
Rugby union rivalries in Wales